A gun shop (also known by various other names such as firearm store and gun store) is a business that sells firearms, such as handguns and long guns, to individuals in an open shopping format. It may also provide repairs for firearms and their parts. Other items such as ammunition, hunting accessories, food, clothing, and even souvenirs may be sold in the store as well.

Often having designs reminiscent of other establishments such as department stores and grocery stores, gun shops operate under widely different gun control laws depending on the specific nation, locality, and jurisdiction involved. Some locations may only employ a single gunsmith in a small space, while others might have many individuals working in a large space.

Although the advent of online shopping has changed the business of gun stores, the ability for customers to interact face to face with store dealers often is seen as having advantages, examples being personally guiding individuals buying firearms through the regulated purchase processes set up by local and national laws. Employees may also offer specific advice about firearm specifications. Various firearm-related websites exist that partner, either directly or indirectly, with physical stores

In the United States, gun shops are required to have a permitting notice known as a Federal Firearms License. These licenses exist in order to administer federally mandated regulations such as bans on straw purchasing.

Services and trends

Europe

Gun laws in Europe vary dramatically from nation to nation, with some areas having what amounts to a near total ban on civilian access to firearms while others have systems of moderate regulation. Nearly all nations contain stricter laws than that of the United States, particularly in terms of measures to require firearms training, mandate background checks, and impose confiscation of weapons upon the committing of felony crimes.

Gun legislation in Germany provides as a contrast. Individuals who desire to acquire a firearm have to meet stringent standards to receive an ownership license (German: Waffenbesitzkarte or WBK). Personal characteristics such as mental fitness and ability to physically handle the weapons well are evaluated. Germans under the age of 21, unable to prove their citizenship status, possessing a documented history of mental illness, or otherwise failing to meet the guidelines will not receive the license.

Mexico

Retail gun shops are not legal in Mexico. The Directorate of Commercialization of Arms and Munitions (Dirección de Comercialización de Armamento y Municiones - DCAM) is the only outlet authorized to sell firearms and ammunition in the country. The business is located in Mexico City near the headquarters of the Secretariat of National Defense. No other legitimate sales may take place in the country.

Examples of specific companies with items sold in Mexico City include Beretta and Colt; rifles used in hunting are particularly available. The privately owned firearms are registered with the Mexican military and may be transported outside of the home only with a specific permit, which must be renewed annually. Prospective customers go through a system of strict regulations. Factors such as the amount of ammunition that an individual can buy each month are controlled.

United States

As of early 2019, there were approximately sixty-three thousand licensed gun dealers in the U.S.

Akin to other general-interest shopping stores, sales at firearm shops tend to increase during the holiday season, with the month of December providing stores with the best margins. In the United States, prices for many firearms decreased in the aftermath of the Great Recession, even as general sales remained relatively high.

Gun store customers in places such as the southern United States often report various reasons for purchasing guns. One motivation is the fear of future gun control. Another is personal protection. Some individuals express interest using their gun purchase as a store of value because, according to one shop owner, "Game boxes break. Firearms don't."

Although it is commonly thought that most gun purchases take place in the context of a firearm-specific independent business, data from the U.S. shows that many purchases actually take place in large chain stores. Walmart in particular is the best-selling small arms retailer in the U.S. 

Firearm distributors need to comply with rigorous checks from the Bureau of Alcohol, Tobacco, Firearms and Explosives on a local, state, and federal level.

See also

Arms industry
Gun shows in the United States
Gunsmith
List of firearms

References

Firearm commerce
Retailers by type of merchandise sold